Keenon Laine (born 12 June 1997) is an American track and field athlete who competes in the high jump.

In 2019, he jumped 2.28 m indoor (Fayetteville, AR), 2.26 m outdoor, then finished sixth at 2019 USA Track & Field Outdoor Championships, then qualifying for the 2019 World Championships in Doha.
He finished fifth at the 2019 Pan American Games and won the 2019 NACAC U23 Championships in Querétaro.

References

Living people
American male high jumpers
1997 births
Pan American Games track and field athletes for the United States
Athletes (track and field) at the 2019 Pan American Games
People from Versailles, Kentucky
Georgia Bulldogs track and field athletes